The House of Gold is a 1918 American silent drama film, directed by Edwin Carewe. It stars Emmy Wehlen, Joseph Kilgour, and Hugh Thompson, and was released on June 17, 1918.

Cast
 Emmy Wehlen as Pamela Martin
 Joseph Kilgour as Douglas Martin/Gilbert Martin
 Hugh Thompson as Frank Steele
 Helen Lindroth as Mrs. Stanley Cartwright
 Maud Hill as Mrs. Alicia Temple

References

External links 
 
 
 

Metro Pictures films
Films directed by Edwin Carewe
American silent feature films
American black-and-white films
Silent American drama films
1918 drama films
1918 films
1910s English-language films
1910s American films